Architecture's Desire: Reading the Late Avant-Garde (2010) is a book written by American architecture theorist K. Michael Hays, published by MIT Press. According to WorldCat, the book is held in 1009 libraries.

The book has been reviewed by Mark Linder in Journal of Architectural Education; Peggy Deamer in  The Journal of Architecture,; and Sarah Butler in Journal of Design History.

References

2010 non-fiction books
Architecture books
MIT Press books